Marquerite Clarisse Nicolette Hennique-Valentin (17 April 1882 – 11 April 1956) was a French symbolist poet.

Life

Nicolette Hennique was daughter of the novelist Léon Hennique and Nicolette-Louise Dupont-Châtelain.
She was born in Paris on 17 April 1882. She married Pierre Paul Henri Valentin.
She inherited the house where Nicolas de Condorcet was born, now the Condorcet Museum.
She was a member of the Society for propagation of art books.

Hennique was one of a number of pre-war women poets in France who followed and emulated the symbolism of Stéphane Mallarmé, and who have now been largely forgotten.
The highly original work of Hennique and women such as Lucie Delarue-Mardrus, Anna de Noailles, Renée Vivien, Gérard d'Houville and Marie Dauguet(fr) astonished the critics, who saw it as a sign of a moral and social revolution as well as a literary one.
She contributed to several journals: L'ermitage, L'hémicycle, La revue blanche, La revue and Le gaulois.

In 1955 Hennique published a moving book of memories of her father.
This biography, written towards the end of her life, was anecdotal and at times hagiographical.
However, it is the most detailed study available, and informative about his links with the Théâtre Libre and the Académie Goncourt, and with contemporary naturalist writers.

Reception

A review of Des rêves et des choses (1900) in L'He-micycle (15 April 1900) praised its abundant vigour, melancholy and beauty but said what was really new was its profile of a poet with wide and daring dreams, whose beautiful deep eyes caress the contour of things.
Henri Duvernois classifies her among the Parnassians.
Nicolette Hennique, almost a child again, has been able to force the attention of scholars with Dreams and Things, Heroes and Gods. (Le Gaulois (Paris, 1968)
"The strange phenomenon! to sing Greek, to think Greek, to see Greek, to dream Greek, as well as the great Sappho of Mitylene and to call herself floristically Nicolette!" Émile Bergerat

Publications 
Publications by Hennique include:

Other publications were:

Notes

Sources

1882 births
French women poets
1956 deaths
Writers from Paris
20th-century French poets
20th-century French women writers